Gert Kompajn (born 13 September 1960) is an Austrian ice hockey player. He competed in the men's tournament at the 1988 Winter Olympics.

References

1960 births
Living people
Austrian ice hockey players
Olympic ice hockey players of Austria
Ice hockey players at the 1988 Winter Olympics
Sportspeople from Klagenfurt
20th-century Austrian people